Marvin Musquin (born 30 December 1989 in La Réole, France) is a French professional motocross and supercross racer. He competed in the Motocross World Championships from 2004 to 2010 and, has competed in the AMA Motocross Championships since 2011.

Motocross career
In 2004, Musquin won the European Motocross Championship in the 85cc class. He followed this by winning the 2006 125cc Junior World Championship. He competed on a privateer Honda in the 2008 F.I.M. MX2-GP world championship, finishing in 14th place.

Musquin won the 2009 F.I.M. MX2-GP World Championship and, successfully defended his title in 2010 while riding for the KTM factory racing team managed by former world champion Stefan Everts.

Since 2011, Musquin has competed in the 250cc class of the AMA Motocross Championship, finishing the 2013 season in third place overall. In 2014 he won the first Red Bull Straight Rhythm in the 250cc class. In 2015 he won the East Supercross 250MX class Championship. Musquin was also a member of the victorious French 2015 Motocross des Nations team that included Gautier Paulin and Romain Febvre.

In 2016, Musquin finished third behind Ken Roczen and Eli Tomac in the AMA pro Motocross championship. In 2017, he finished second 17 points behind Eli Tomac in the Motocross Championship. He finished 2nd 9 points behind Jason Anderson in the 2018 Monster Energy AMA 450 Supercross Championship.

Musquin previously trained under the stewardship of professional motocross trainer Aldon Baker.

Personal Life 
Musquin married his long-time girlfriend, Mathilde, on 13 September 2019. They have one child together, a daughter born in December 2022.

References

External links 
 Marvin Musquin KTM profile

1989 births
Living people
Sportspeople from Gironde
French motocross riders